The Hydronauts is a German-French-Finnish television series. It is a production of Milimages (France), Toons'n'tales (Germany), and Epidem Zot (Finland) for France 5, Kika, and NDR. The show's main curriculum is about animal facts, science, and discoveries of the sea.

Characters
 Neptuna, an alien astronaut and the leader of the group. Voiced by Emily Dormer.
 Balty, a seal (or sea lion) and a second-in-command member of the group. Voiced by Gary Martin.
 Ponto, a seagull considered to be the silliest of the group. Voiced by Keith Wickham.
 Obo, a computer that gives the Hydronauts ocean facts. Voiced by Dan Russell.
 Gloob, Neptuna's octopus who only makes gibbering noises. Voiced by Emma Tate.

See also
List of German television series

External links
 

2003 German television series debuts
2003 German television series endings
German children's animated television series
Nautical television series
German-language television shows